Tribistovo is a village in Bosnia and Herzegovina. According to the 1991 census, the village is located in the municipality of Posušje.

Eight people were killed by carbon monoxide poisoning in a cottage in Tribistovo on 1 January 2021, during a New Year's celebration.

Demographics 
According to the 2013 census, its population was 178, all Croats.

References

Populated places in Posušje